Alhadj Moustafa (Arabic:الحاج مصطفى) (born 1 June 1992) is a Qatari born-Sudanese footballer who plays for Al-Kharaitiyat as a defender.

Career
He formerly played for El Jaish, Mesaimeer, Al-Markhiya, Al-Khor, Al-Kharaitiyat , and Al-Shamal.

External links

References

Living people
1992 births
Qatari footballers
Qatari people of Sudanese descent
Naturalised citizens of Qatar
Sudanese emigrants to Qatar
El Jaish SC players
Mesaimeer SC players
Al-Markhiya SC players
Al-Khor SC players
Al Kharaitiyat SC players
Al-Shamal SC players
Qatar Stars League players
Qatari Second Division players
Association football defenders
Place of birth missing (living people)